Drosera spatulata, the spoon-leaved sundew,  is a variable, rosette-forming sundew with spoon-shaped leaves. The specific epithet is Latin for "spatula shaped," a reference to the form of the leaves. This sundew has a large range and occurs naturally throughout Southeast Asia, southern China and Japan, Micronesia, Papua New Guinea, eastern Australia, Tasmania and New Zealand. Variants are often known by the localities in which they are found. The plant does not form hibernacula in winter, and is easily grown using the same methods as Drosera capensis.

Carnivorous plant growers consider D. spatulata to be a weed because it is very hardy and produces copious amounts of seed when it flowers. The seed also germinates without much difficulty, causing little plants to pop up in surrounding pots.

Description

Drosera spatulata is a variable perennial plant that produces small rosettes of numerous spathulate leaves. Each leaf is attached to the central rosette by a narrow 8 mm long petiole that is only glandular on the upper half. Individual leaf laminae are typically 5 mm long and 4 mm wide. Each flower can be up to 6 mm across.

Taxonomy and botanical history

Drosera spatulata was first described by Jacques Labillardière in his 1804 publication Novae Hollandiae Plantarum Specimen. In 1824, D. spatulata was included in a publication by Augustin Pyramus de Candolle, but misprinted as Drosera spathulata, an incorrect spelling that is still common today. Since its original description, this species has been described under several other names, which have now been reduced to synonymy. Two varieties have been described and are currently recognized, the first of which was described in 2005. Drosera spatulata var. gympiensis was described in 2005 by Robert Gibson and Ivan Snyder, who cited its consistently hairy sepals with no intergradation with the typical D. spatulata form. In 2009 another variety, Drosera spatulata var. bakoensis, was described from Bako National Park in Sarawak, Borneo.

Synonyms
D. loureirii Hook. & Arn.
D. lovellae F.M.Bail.
D. minutula Col.
D. propinqua Cunn.
D. spatulata var. loureirii (Hook. & Arn.) Y.Z.Ruan
D. triflora Col.

Cultivars
Drosera 'Hong Kong' {D'Amato}
Drosera 'Kanto' {D'Amato}
Drosera 'Ruby Slippers' {W.J.Clemens}
Drosera 'Tamlin' {W.Dawnstar}

References

External links

Carnivorous plants of Asia
Carnivorous plants of Australia
Carnivorous plants of New Zealand
Carnivorous plants of the Pacific
spatulata
Caryophyllales of Australia
Flora of China
Flora of Japan
Flora of Hong Kong
Flora of Taiwan
Flora of Palau
Flora of the Philippines
Flora of Borneo
Flora of New Guinea
Flora of Queensland
Flora of New South Wales
Flora of Victoria (Australia)
Flora of Tasmania